The Communauté de communes du Sud-Ouest Amiénois  is a former communauté de communes in the Somme département and in the Picardie région of France. It was created in June 2004. It was merged into the new Communauté de communes Somme Sud-Ouest in January 2017.

History
The communauté de communes succeeded the Syndicat mixte Pays Somme sud ouest (SMPSSO), the dissolution taking effect on 1 January 2008. The ‘’syndicat mixte’’, created in 1981, covered 6 of the neighbouring cantons. 
The new body was created by order of the prefect on 30 June 2004. It included 63 communes in the cantons of Hornoy-le-Bourg, Poix-de-Picardie and part of the Canton de Molliens-Dreuil.

Composition 
This Communauté de communes comprised 63 communes:

Airaines
Arguel, Somme
Aumont, Somme
Avelesges
Beaucamps-le-Jeune
Beaucamps-le-Vieux
Belloy-Saint-Léonard
Bergicourt
Bettembos
Blangy-sous-Poix
Bougainville, Somme
Briquemesnil-Floxicourt
Brocourt
Bussy-lès-Poix
Camps-en-Amiénois
Caulières
Courcelles-sous-Moyencourt
Croixrault
Dromesnil
Éplessier
Équennes-Éramecourt
Famechon, Somme
Fluy
Fourcigny
Fresnoy-au-Val
Fricamps
Gauville
Guizancourt
Hescamps
Hornoy-le-Bourg
Lachapelle, Somme
Lafresguimont-Saint-Martin
Laleu, Somme
Lamaronde
Le Quesne
Lignières-Châtelain
Liomer
Marlers
Meigneux, Somme
Méréaucourt
Méricourt-en-Vimeu
Métigny
Molliens-Dreuil
Montagne-Fayel
Morvillers-Saint-Saturnin
Moyencourt-lès-Poix
Neuville-Coppegueule
Offignies
Oissy
Poix-de-Picardie
Quesnoy-sur-Airaines
Quevauvillers
Riencourt
Saint-Aubin-Montenoy
Sainte-Segrée
Saint-Germain-sur-Bresle
Saulchoy-sous-Poix
Tailly, Somme
Thieulloy-l'Abbaye
Thieulloy-la-Ville
Villers-Campsart
Vraignes-lès-Hornoy
Warlus, Somme

Other groupings 
The Community Council, on 14 June 2007, adopted the principle of membership of the "Syndicat mixte du Pays du Grand Amiénois".

Projects and goals 
The Community plans to carry out or support actions: 
 In terms of economic development, for example, around the future motorway interchange on the A29 at Croixrault.
 In areas of direct interest to the lives of the people: housing (plan of action for the implementation of multi-family housing), culture (financing actions promoting libraries) and multimedia (development in the intercommunal territory).

See also 
Communes of the Somme department

References 

Sud-Ouest Amienois